Xorazm FK Urganch is an Uzbek professional football club based in Urganch, that competes in the Uzbekistan Pro League.

Current squad

Personnel

Current Technical Staff

Management

Current Board of Directors and Administrators

External links 
 Weltfussballarchiv

Football clubs in Uzbekistan
1972 establishments in Uzbekistan
Association football clubs established in 1972
1972 establishments in the Soviet Union